Single pot still whiskey is a style of Irish whiskey made by a single distillery from a mixed mash of malted and unmalted barley distilled in a pot still. Somewhat similar to single malt whiskey, the style was defined by its inclusion of unmalted raw barley in the mash in addition to malt. However, small amounts of raw oats or wheat may have been used at times. This unmalted component is said to give the pot still whiskey a "spicier bristle" and "thicker texture" than the otherwise similar malt whiskeys. If the whiskey is not distilled completely on the site of a single distillery, then it may be termed pot still whiskey but not single pot still whiskey.

Once the most popular type of whiskey in the world, this style of whiskey was historically referred to as pure pot still whiskey, Irish-style pot still whiskey, or – especially in Ireland – simply as pot still whiskey. The term "single pot still" was only introduced in recent years to overcome the United States Tax and Trade Bureau's objections to the use of the term "pure" in the labelling of food and drink.

The term should not be confused with the theoretical concept of whiskey produced solely in a pot still (which would also apply to single malt whiskey as well as some examples of pot still bourbon and rye whiskey).

Science of pot still distillation 
To separate components from a mixture of liquids, the liquid can be heated to force components, which have different boiling points, into the gas phase. The wash is poured into a still, usually made of copper, and heated using steam. The wash consists of many chemicals, malted barley, alcohol, water, and sugar. The alcohol, along with some other chemicals, needs to be separated. By using steam to heat the still, alcohol and some volatile chemicals are evaporated first. As the gas travels upwards, it is directed into another tube around which cold water is constantly flowing. After the gas travels through the cold tube, the gas is condensed back into a liquid and collected in a separate vessel. Depending on how the wash is turned in the still, different chemicals (aldehydes, esters, higher alcohols, and a number of other substances in very small amounts) are evaporated. A rummerger is used to constantly stir the wash to prevent burning of solid particles. After the first wash, there is still 6–7% solids from the barley in the wash. During the heating process, kinetic energy increases (molecules move faster) until they start to change phases. Then entropy increases from the phase change. In the cooling pipe, kinetic energy and entropy both decrease resulting in another phase change from gas to liquid. In this process, not all of the solids are removed and some make it through the first distillation process.

History 
Whiskey has been distilled in Ireland since at least the 1400s and most likely as early as the 6th century. Single pot still whiskey emerged as a means of avoiding a tax introduced in 1785 on the use of malted barley. Although this tax was repealed in 1855, the popularity of the style endured until the emergence of blends in the late 19th and early 20th centuries.

In the 19th century, single pot still whiskey was the most popular style of whiskey in the world and formed the bulk of Ireland's whiskey exports. However, with the rise of cheaper, milder blended whiskeys in the 20th century, single pot still whiskey declined in popularity, and many formerly all-pot-still brands changed their production to become blends. By 1980, only two specialist bottlings remained in existence, Green Spot and Redbreast, with one in danger of being discontinued. However, in recent years, a resurgence in whiskey distilling in Ireland has led to the launch of several new single pot still whiskeys.

Legal definition 
In addition to the general regulations governing the production of Irish whiskey (e.g., geographical origin, aging in wooden casks for a minimum of three years), Irish government regulations stipulate that Irish pot still whiskey must be:
 Distilled from a mash of a combination of malted barley, unmalted barley, and other unmalted cereals
 Distilled in a pot still so that the distillate has the aroma and taste of the materials used
 Made with a minimum of 30% malted barley and 30% unmalted barley

In addition, the regulation documents state that:
 Up to 5% of cereals other than malted and unmalted barley, such as oats and rye, may be used
 Either double or triple distillation may be used, although traditionally most Irish pot still whiskey is triple distilled
 The term "single" can be added if the Irish pot still whiskey is distilled on the site of a single distillery

Whiskeys 
, there are a handful of single pot still whiskeys on the market. However, due to the construction of several new distilleries in Ireland in recent years, several more single pot whiskeys are expected to be released in the coming years. Those available as of mid-2018 include:

 Dingle Single Pot Still (released in late 2017)
 Green Spot, Yellow Spot, and Red Spot
 Midleton (Barry Crockett Legacy, Dair Ghaelach)
 Powers (Three Swallows, Signature Release, John's Lane)
 Redbreast (12, 12 Cask Strength, 15, 21, Lustau Edition)
Teeling Single Pot Still (released in August 2018)

References

Notes

Bibliography

 bostonapothecary.com/wp-content/uploads/2013/11/the-application-of-chemistry-to-pot-still-distillation1.pdf
 https://www.whisky.com/information/knowledge/production/details/the-scottish-pot-stills.html
 https://www.thoughtco.com/what-is-distillation-601964

External links 
 Single Pot Still Single Pot Still whiskey portal run by Irish Distillers.

Irish whiskey
Whisky